Ran-binding protein 3 is a protein that in humans is encoded by the RANBP3 gene.

This gene encodes a protein with a RanBD1 domain that is found in both the nucleus and cytoplasm. This protein plays a role in nuclear export as part of a heteromeric complex. Alternate transcriptional splice variants, encoding different isoforms, have been characterized.

Interactions
RANBP3 has been shown to interact with RCC1 and XPO1.

References

Further reading